Phoenix Championship Wrestling was a professional wrestling promotion based in Toms River, New Jersey from 2001 to 2003. Former employees in PCW consisted of professional wrestlers, managers, play-by-play and color commentators, announcers, interviewers and referees.

Alumni

Male wrestlers

Stables and tag teams

Managers and valets

Commentators and interviewers

Referees

Other personnel

References
General

Specific

External links

The PCW Fan Zone
Phoenix Championship Wrestling alumni at Wrestlingdata.com

Phoenix Championship Wrestling alumni